John Murray is a British publisher, known for the authors it has published in its long history including Jane Austen, Sir Arthur Conan Doyle, Lord Byron, Charles Lyell,  Johann Wolfgang von Goethe, Herman Melville, Edward Whymper, Thomas Malthus, David Ricardo, and Charles Darwin. Since 2004, it has been owned by conglomerate Lagardère under the Hachette UK brand. Business publisher Nicholas Brealey became an imprint of John Murray in 2015.

History

The business was founded in London in 1768 by John Murray (1737–1793), an Edinburgh-born Royal Marines officer, who built up a list of authors including Isaac D'Israeli and published the English Review.

John Murray the elder was one of the founding sponsors of the London evening newspaper The Star in 1788.

He was succeeded by his son John Murray II, who made the publishing house important and influential. He was a friend of many leading writers of the day and launched the Quarterly Review in 1809. He was the publisher of Jane Austen, Sir Walter Scott, Washington Irving, George Crabbe, Mary Somerville and many others. His home and office at 50 Albemarle Street in Mayfair was the centre of a literary circle, fostered by Murray's tradition of "Four o'clock friends", afternoon tea with his writers.

Murray's most notable author was Lord Byron, who became a close friend and correspondent of his. Murray published many of his major works, paying him over £20,000 in rights. On 10 March 1812 Murray published Byron's second book, Childe Harold's Pilgrimage, which sold out in five days, leading to Byron's observation "I awoke one morning and found myself famous".

On 17 May 1824 Murray participated in one of the most notorious acts in the annals of literature. Byron had given him the manuscript of his personal memoirs to publish later on. Together with five of Byron's friends and executors, he decided to destroy Byron's manuscripts because he thought the scandalous details would damage Byron's reputation. With only Thomas Moore objecting, the two volumes of memoirs were dismembered and burnt in the fireplace at Murray's office. It remains unknown what they contained.

John Murray III (1808–1892) continued the business and published Charles Eastlake's first English translation of Goethe's Theory of Colours (1840), David Livingstone's Missionary Travels (1857), and Charles Darwin's Origin of Species (1859). John Murray III also started the Murray Handbooks in 1836, a series of travel guides from which modern-day guides are directly descended. The rights to these guides were sold around 1900 and subsequently acquired in 1915 by the Blue Guides.

His successor Sir John Murray IV (1851–1928) was publisher to Queen Victoria. Among other works, he published Murray's Magazine from 1887 until 1891. From 1904 he published the Wisdom of the East book series. Competitor Smith, Elder & Co. was acquired in 1917.

His son Sir John Murray V (1884–1967), grandson John Murray VI (John Arnaud Robin Grey Murray, known as Jock Murray; 1909–1993) and great-grandson John Murray VII (John Richmond Grey Murray; 1941–) continued the business until it was taken over.

In 2002, John Murray was acquired by Hodder Headline, which was itself acquired in 2004 by the French conglomerate Lagardère Group. Since then, it has been an imprint under Lagardère brand Hachette UK.

In 2015, business publisher Nicholas Brealey became an imprint of John Murray.

John Murray archive
The John Murray Archive was offered for sale to the nation by John Murray VII for £31 million and the National Library of Scotland has acquired it, including the manuscript of Charles Darwin's Origin of Species. On 26 January 2005, it was announced that the National Library was to be given £17.7m by the Heritage Lottery Fund towards the £31.2m price offered by John Murray on condition the Library digitise the materials and make them available. The Scottish Government agreed to contribute £8.3m, with the Library setting a £6.5m fundraising target for the remainder.

John Murray timeline

 1768 – John MacMurray, a former lieutenant of the Marines, buys a bookselling business at 32 Fleet Street. He changes his name to Murray and uses his naval contacts to build up a thriving business
 1806 – The first bestseller, A New System of Domestic Cookery, by A Lady (Maria Rundell), was published, with a second edition two years later.
 1809 – The influential periodical the Quarterly Review founded
 1811 – Childe Harold's Pilgrimage by Lord Byron published
 1812 – John Murray moved to 50 Albemarle Street, its home for the next 191 years
 1815 – Jane Austen decides she would like to move to Murray with Emma, published in 1815
 1816 – Coleridge moved to John Murray for Christabel and Other Poems, which included 'Kubla Khan'
 1830 – First part of the three volume Principles of Geology by Charles Lyell published
 1836 – The first guide books, Murray's Handbooks, published by John Murray III
 1849 – A groundbreaking observational study on the Sikh people is published. This comprehensive account arguably foreshadowed the British Empire's first large-scale attempt at using the scientific method to civilise populations; this methodological approach later became known as Eugenics.
 1857 – David Livingstone's Missionary Travels, published – one of the many great 19th-century publications of exploration from John Murray
 1859 – On the Origin of Species by Charles Darwin published
 1859 – The first self-help book, Samuel Smiles's Self Help, published
 1863 – Henry Walter Bates's The Naturalist on the River Amazons published
 1865 – Narrative of an Expedition to the Zambesi and its Tributaries; and of the Discovery of the Lakes Shirwa and Nyassa. 1858-1864 by David and Charles Livingstone published
 1871 – Edward Whymper Scrambles Amongst the Alps in the Years 1860-69, The first ascent of the Matterhorn in 1865
 1891 – Edward Whymper Travels Amongst the Great Andes of the Equator, Two volumes recording ascents in the Ecuadorian Andes of Chimborazo, Cotopaxi, Cayambe (volcano), and other Andean Peaks
 1912 – June, Published Behind The Night Light by Nancy Price, which was reprinted in June 1912, September 1912 and January 1913.
 1921 – An Etymological Dictionary of Modern English by Ernest Weekley published
 1934 – Dr. Julius Kugy Alpine Pilgrimage (1st edition (English) 1934), Klugy's literary masterpiece on the Julian Alps of Slovenia as translated by H. E. G. Tyndale (Henry Edmund Guise Tyndale)
 1938 – Daniele Varè's biography The Laughing Diplomat is published 
 1958 – John Betjeman's Collected Poems published and has sold over 2 million copies to date
 1967 – Last issue of the Quarterly Review published
 1969 – The first TV tie-in, Kenneth Clark's Civilisation, published
 1975 – Ruth Prawer Jhabvala's Heat and Dust wins the Booker Prize
 1977 – The "greatest travel book of the twentieth century", A Time of Gifts by Patrick Leigh Fermor published
 2002 – John Murray leaves family hands after seven generations
 2002 – Peacemakers by Margaret MacMillan wins the Samuel Johnson Prize, the Duff Cooper Prize and the Hessell-Tiltman Prize
 2003 – The first new acquisition since the company became part of Hodder Headline (now Hachette), A Million Little Pieces by James Frey, becomes a perennial and controversial bestseller
 2004 – Rebirth of the John Murray fiction list with Neil Jordan's Shade
 2005 – Beasts of No Nation by Uzodinma Iweala wins John Llewellyn Rhys Prize
 2007 – Mister Pip by Lloyd Jones becomes a global bestseller, wins the Commonwealth Writers' Prize and is shortlisted for the Man Booker Prize
 2008 – Amitav Ghosh launches his epic Ibis trilogy with Sea of Poppies, shortlisted for the Man Booker Prize
 2008 – Down River by John Hart wins Edgar Award for Best Novel
 2008 – The Secret Life of Words by Henry Hitchings wins the John Llewellyn Rhys Prize
 2009 – The Last Child by John Hart wins CWA Ian Fleming Steel Dagger/ITV Thriller of the Year Award, and the Edgar Award for Best Novel
 2009 – Martyr by Rory Clements, special mention in CWA Ellis Peters Historical Fiction Award
 2009 – Up in the Air by Walter Kirn turned into a film starring George Clooney
 2010 – Revenger by Rory Clements wins CWA Ellis Peters Historical Fiction Award
 2010 – Film Sarah's Key, starring Kristin Scott Thomas, released, based on Tatiana de Rosnay's novel of the same name
 2010 – Wait For Me! by Deborah Devonshire shortlisted for the British Book Awards Biography of the Year
 2011 – Mistaken by Neil Jordan wins Irish Book of the Year Award
 2012 – Icelight by Aly Monroe wins CWA Ellis Peters Historical Fiction Award
 2012 – Lloyd Jones's Mister Pip adapted into a film starring Hugh Laurie
 2012 – Patrick Leigh Fermor: An Adventure by Artemis Cooper shortlisted for the Costa Biography Award, the Waterstone's Book of the Year Award and the National Book Awards Biography of the Year 
 2020 – The Stonemason (book): A History of Building Britain by Andrew Ziminski.
 2022 – The crime fiction and thriller imprint Baskerville is launched

Film adaptations of John Murray titles
 Up in the Air (2009) – based on the novel by Walter Kirn, starring George Clooney and Anna Kendrick
 Sarah's Key (2010) – based on the novel by Tatiana de Rosnay, starring Kristin Scott Thomas
 Mister Pip (2012) – based on the novel by Lloyd Jones, starring Hugh Laurie

References

Further reading

External links

 Official website
 
 National Library of Scotland - John Murray archive (accessed 20 October 2016)
 
 
 Works by John Murray at Hathi Trust
 Darwin Project, a project to publish all of the correspondence of Charles Darwin, including his correspondence with Murray.

Archives in Scotland
Book publishing companies of the United Kingdom
1768 establishments in England
Companies based in the City of Westminster
Publishing companies established in the 1760s
British companies established in 1768